
Year 658 (DCLVIII) was a common year starting on Monday (link will display the full calendar) of the Julian calendar. The denomination 658 for this year has been used since the early medieval period, when the Anno Domini calendar era became the prevalent method in Europe for naming years.

Events 
 By place 

 Byzantine Empire 
 Emperor Constans II undertakes an expedition to the Balkan Peninsula, and defeats the Avars in Macedonia. He temporarily reasserts Byzantine rule, and resettles some of them in Anatolia to fight against the Rashidun Caliphate (approximate date).

 Europe 
 The confederation of Slavic tribes falls apart after the death of King Samo. A Slav principality is formed from the kingdom's remnants in Carinthia (modern Austria), and the Avars capture most of its territory in Hungary (approximate date).

 Britain 
 Battle of Peonnum: King Cenwalh and the Wessex Saxons make a push against Dumnonia (South West England). They are victorious at Penselwood in Somerset, and the Dumnonia-Wessex border is set at the River Parrett (approximate date).
 A revolt led by three Mercian noblemen (Immin, Eata, and Eadberht) installs Wulfhere (son of king Penda) as ruler of Mercia, and drives out the supporters of King Oswiu of Northumbria.

 Asia 
 The Chinese Buddhist monks Zhi Yu and Zhi You recreate several south-pointing chariots, for the Japanese prince Tenji. This is a 3rd-century device made by Ma Jun, and acts as a mechanical-driven directional-compass vehicle (according to the Nihon Shoki).
 Chinese forces defeat the Western Turkic Kaganate (Central Asia). The West kaganate becomes a vassal of the Tang Dynasty. During the power vacuum, Turgesh tribes emerge as the leading power (approximate date).

Births 
 Willibrord, Anglo-Saxon missionary

Deaths 
 Cellach mac Máele Coba, high king of Ireland
 Chu Suiliang, chancellor of the Tang Dynasty (b. 597)
 Clovis II, king of Neustria and Burgundy (or 657) 
 Du Zhenglun, chancellor of the Tang Dynasty
 Erchinoald, mayor of the Palace of Neustria
 Jajang, Korean Buddhist monk (b. 590)
 Judicael, high king of Domnonée
 Samo, king of the Slavs (Carinthia)
 Yuchi Gong, general of the Tang Dynasty (b. 585)

References

Sources